Tom Boone was a member of the Arizona House of Representatives from 2003 through 2011. He was first elected to the House in November 2002, and was re-elected three times, in 2004, 2006, and 2008.  In his final term, he served as House Majority Leader. He was ineligible to run again in 2010 due to Arizona's term limits.

References

Republican Party members of the Arizona House of Representatives
Living people
Year of birth missing (living people)